Tracy Splinter (born 28 October 1971 in Cape Town, South Africa) is a German-South African writer and spoken-word author who mysteriously disappeared in August 2016 in Switzerland. Splinter had acquired German citizenship in 1997. Her works were in English, German and Afrikaans.

Biography
In 1999, Tracy Splinter stood for Hamburg in the German-speaking slam poetry championship in Weimar, Germany. Splinter made it to the finals and won the competition which took place in two nights.

Splinter provided technical language guidance toward the publication of the book "Transatlantic Modernism" in 2009, a literary criticism of "Modernism in Europe and modernism in the United States".

Disappearance and search
Last seen at the Alpina and Schnider hotels, Splinter went missing in August 2016 in Vals, Graubünden in Eastern Switzerland. Her luggage containing her personal belongings including "suitcase with clothes, a backpack, a laptop, a camera, mountain sticks and several personal documents" were found intact at her hotel room with no presence of herself. After a year with no news of her whereabouts her parents hired a private investigator to find her. , her whereabouts are still not known.

See also
List of people who disappeared

References

1971 births
2010s missing person cases
Missing person cases in Switzerland
South African writers
Possibly living people